Black Hands, White Sails: The Story of African-American Whalers is a 1999 book by Patricia McKissack and Frederick McKissack about the involvement of African-Americans in the history of whaling in the United States.

Reception
Booklist, in its review of Black Hands, White Sails, called it a "fascinating look at the convergent histories of whaling and the abolitionist movement" and concluded "Less-skilled readers may have difficulty following the expansive narrative that pulls in details from several different angles, but history buffs and researchers should find the book's complexity rewarding." and Library Journal found it "A well-researched and detailed book "

Black Hands, White Sails has also been reviewed by The ALAN Review, Kirkus Reviews, The Horn Book Magazine. and Voice of Youth Advocates,

Awards
1997-1999 NCTE Books For You:  An Annotated Booklist for Senior High
2000 Carter G. Woodson Secondary Book Award - honor
2000 CCBC Choice
2000 Coretta Scott King Award author honor.
2000 Society of Midland Authors Children's Nonfiction Award - winner

References

1999 children's books
20th-century history books
American children's books
Books about African-American history
Whaling in the United States
Children's history books
Books by Patricia McKissack